Lucienne Jeanne Marie Charlot, known by the name Lucienne Vigier and later Lucienne Legrand, (18 July 1920 – 19 October 2022) was a French actress.

Filmography

Film
 (1941)
 (1941)
Romance of Paris (1941)
Bolero (1942)
Miss Bonaparte (1942)
 (1942)
 (1944)
 (1944)
Children of Paradise (1945)
Women's Games (1946)
After Love (1948)
 (1949)
Tuesday's Guest (1950)
Rue de l'Estrapade (1953)
The Three Musketeers (1953)
At the Order of the Czar (1954)
The Contessa's Secret (1954)
The Count of Bragelonne (1954)
Frou-Frou (1955)
 (1955)
 (1957)
Speaking of Murder (1957)
Dear Louise (1972)
César and Rosalie (1972)
 (1973)
 (1973)
Shock Treatment (1973)
A Slightly Pregnant Man (1973)
Le Magnifique (1973)
Forbidden Priests (1973)
Hail the Artist (1973)
The Train (1973)
Stavisky (1974)
Creezy (1974)
Verdict (1974)
Vincent, François, Paul and the Others (1974)
 (1975)
 (1975)
Dracula and Son (1976)
Mado (1976)
The French Woman (1977)
The Lacemaker (1977)
CIA contro KGB (1978)
La Carapate (1978)
 (1979)
A Little Romance (1979)
La Boum 2 (1982)
 (1988)
Love in Paris (1997)
 (2000)

Television
 (1992)

Theatre
Ce soir à Samarcande (1950)
 (1967)
Madame Sans-Gêne (1973)

References

1920 births
2022 deaths
French film actresses
French stage actresses
French centenarians
Women centenarians
People from Douai